Manifest: The Chryzinium Era is a 2017 American science fiction short film drama, written, directed and produced by Rick Lord, Phillip Wade and Tim Wade, in which Madison and her father are outcasts in a society ruled by an alien civilization. Survival is becoming more difficult, forcing Madison to make a decision that will change her life forever. The film stars Phoebe Jacobs, Rick Lord and Tim Wade.

Plot 
The film opens in the park with a family having a picnic. The father is John, a respected doctor. He has a wife and two children, Cory and Madison. Madison hasn't been born yet. In the coming years John's wife dies of cancer and a grief-stricken John turns to alcohol. Over time the family loses everything. Narration from Madison states "I thought life couldn't get any harder. But then one night everything changed." The camera pulls away from the small house in the country to reveal a massive spaceship overhead.

One year later Madison is in a country store trying to buy food. Her brother Cory works there but can't let her buy anything. Narration reveals that the aliens have taken over the government and that those who refuse to join them have their rights taken away, including buying or selling. After leaving the store, Cory runs after her with a bag of groceries. He apologises to Madison and says hello to his father. They drive home.

John has flashbacks back to park with his family.

The next morning John leaves the house to trade supplies for water. After he returns they are visited by an alien who encourages Madison to leave her father and join them. In addition to freedom, the drug he offers her will extend her life by one-hundred years. After a discussion with her father, Madison decides to join.

Cast 
 Rick Lord as John
 Phoebe Jacobs as Madison
 Tim Wade as Cory
 Phillip Wade as Eli
 Edward Stiner as Luke
 Tracy Wachter Webber as John's Wife
 Danny O'Donnell as Younger Cory
 Hunter Rose Teal as Girl in Store

Production 

Shooting began on April 22, 2014. The film's opening scenes were shot in Macleay, Oregon at the Macleay Village Store. The film was primarily shot in Salem, Oregon in a warehouse where the interior house set was built. The exterior house set was built in Stayton, Oregon

Release 

Accolades

Feature Film 

It was announced January 2015 that a feature film by the same title was being adapted from the short film. The film is currently in development.

References

External links 
 
 

Films shot in Oregon
2017 science fiction films
American science fiction films
2010s English-language films
2010s American films